Jo Nicholson (born 1 April 1957) is a former association football player who represented New Zealand at international level.

Nicholson made her Football Ferns début in a 2–2 draw with Australia on 8 October 1979, and finished her international career with five caps to her credit.

References

1957 births
Living people
New Zealand women's international footballers
New Zealand women's association footballers
Women's association footballers not categorized by position